Karlovčić is a village in Serbia. It is situated in the Pećinci municipality, in the Srem District, Vojvodina province. The village has a Serb ethnic majority and its population numbering 1,243 people (2002 census).

Sports
On June 5, 2009, the first representative Cricket match in Serbia's history was played in Karlovčić between the Serbia national cricket team and the Carmel & District Cricket Club.

See also
List of places in Serbia
List of cities, towns and villages in Vojvodina

Populated places in Syrmia
Populated places in Srem District
Pećinci